Hodgetts or Hodgett is a surname. Notable people with the surname include:

 Chris Hodgetts, British racing driver
 David Hodgett
 Dennis Hodgetts
 Frank Hodgetts
 Henry Hodgetts-Foley
 John Hodgetts
 John Hodgetts-Foley
 Samuel Hodgetts
 Stefan Hodgetts